Milan Rajlić (16 October 1916 – 10 May 1952) was a Yugoslav professional footballer and football manager.

Club career
Born in Travnik, Austria-Hungary, Rajlić started his football career in the youth team of Rudar Prijedor in 1931. In 1933, he started playing for the youth team of Slavija Sarajevo, before getting called up to the first team of Slavija in 1935. Rajlić made 84 league appearances for Slavija and scored 41 goals.

In 1941, World War II came to Sarajevo, and he continued to play football in Belgrade with SK Jugoslavija, later joining Sloga Kraljevo in 1943 in the Serbian League. Since Slavija Sarajevo got dissolved by the new communist authorities after the war, Rajlić got assigned to Željezničar. He was a player and a manager at the same time from 1945 to 1947. He appeared in 18 league matches for Željezničar, scoring 5 goals in the two seasons. In 1947, Rajlić was ordered by communist authorities to join newly founded Sarajevo, for which he played until 1949. In total, he turned out in 18 league matches and scored 11 goals for the club.

Not satisfied with being constantly moved around by authorities in Sarajevo, Rajlić relocated to Kraljevo that same year, coming back to Sloga Kraljevo. He played for Sloga until his early death in 1952.

International career
On 22 September 1940, Rajlić made his first and last appearance for the Yugoslavia national team against Romania.

Managerial career
In 1945, Rajlić decided to become a professional football manager while still playing. In the summer of 1945, he signed a contract with Željezničar, becoming the new player-manager of the club. He guided the club to the 1946 Bosnia and Herzegovina Republic League title. In 1949, Rajlić continued his player-manager duties at Sloga Kraljevo after joining the club. He stayed at Sloga until his early death in 1952.

Death and memorial
Rajlić died on 10 May 1952 at the age of 35 in Kraljevo, SFR Yugoslavia. Before the Yugoslav Wars which happened during the 1990s, Rajlić's former club Sloga Kraljevo used to organize an annual tournament named after him. Regular participants were Sloga, Sarajevo and Željezničar, all of them his former clubs.

Career statistics

International

Honours

Player
SK Jugoslavija
Serbian League: 1941–42

Željezničar
Bosnia and Herzegovina Republic League: 1946

Sarajevo
Yugoslav Second League: 1948–49

Manager
Željezničar
Bosnia and Herzegovina Republic League: 1946

References

External links

1916 births
1952 deaths
People from Travnik
People from the Condominium of Bosnia and Herzegovina
Yugoslav footballers
Bosnia and Herzegovina footballers
Yugoslav First League players
Yugoslav Second League players
FK Slavija Sarajevo players
SK Jugoslavija players
FK Sloga Kraljevo players
FK Željezničar Sarajevo players
FK Sarajevo players
Yugoslavia international footballers
Association football forwards
Yugoslav football managers
Bosnia and Herzegovina football managers
Yugoslav First League managers
FK Željezničar Sarajevo managers
FK Sloga Kraljevo managers